The 2017 season is Young Lion's 15th consecutive season in the top flight of Singapore football and in the S.League.

Squad

S.League squad

Prime League squad
(mainly NFA U18)

Coaching staff

Transfers

Pre-season transfers

In

Out

Retained

Mid-season transfers

Out

Friendlies

Pre-season friendlies

In Season friendlies

Team statistics

Appearances and goals

Numbers in parentheses denote appearances as substitute.

Competitions

S.League

References

2017
Singaporean football clubs 2017 season